Emma Sulter (born 15 January 1952 in Fort-de-France, Martinique) is a French athlete who specialised in the 100 metres. Sulter competed at the 1980 Summer Olympics.

References 
 

1952 births
Living people
Sportspeople from Fort-de-France
Martiniquais athletes
French female sprinters
Olympic athletes of France
French people of Martiniquais descent
Athletes (track and field) at the 1980 Summer Olympics
Mediterranean Games gold medalists for France
Athletes (track and field) at the 1979 Mediterranean Games
Mediterranean Games medalists in athletics
Olympic female sprinters